The Olympia Open was a golf tournament on the Nike Tour. It ran from 1996 to 1997. It was played at Indian Summer Golf & Country Club in Olympia, Washington.

In 1997 the winner earned $70,000.

Winners

Notes

Former Korn Ferry Tour events
Golf in Washington (state)
Sports in Olympia, Washington
Recurring sporting events established in 1996
Recurring sporting events disestablished in 1997
1996 establishments in Washington (state)
1997 disestablishments in Washington (state)